2003 in television may refer to:

2003 in Albanian television
2003 in American television
2003 in Australian television
2003 in Belgian television
2003 in Brazilian television
2003 in British television
2003 in Canadian television
2003 in Croatian television
2003 in Danish television
2003 in Dutch television
2003 in Estonian television
2003 in French television
2003 in German television
2003 in Irish television
2003 in Israeli television
2003 in Italian television
2003 in Japanese television
2003 in Jordanian television
2003 in Mexican television
2003 in New Zealand television
2003 in Norwegian television
2003 in Philippine television
2003 in Polish television
2003 in Portuguese television
2003 in Scottish television
2003 in South African television
2003 in Spanish television
2003 in Swedish television
2003 in Turkish television